Sajjadi can be;

People with the surname Sajjadi
Abdul Qayyum Sajjadi - Afghani politician
Abdol-Hamid Heyrat Sajjadi - Iranian Historian and scholar
Bakhtiar Sajjadi - Kurdish writer
Seyed Kamal Sajjadi - Iranian politician
Shahrdad G Sajjadi - British Mathematician